Michael Welch (born 11 January 1982) is a football coach and former player. Born in England, he is a former Republic of Ireland youth international.

Career
Welch was born in Crewe. His other previous clubs include Barnsley and Macclesfield Town.

A former Republic of Ireland youth international, he was signed by Stanley prior to the start of the 2005–06 season after creating a superb impression in the pre season games. He started his career as a trainee at Barnsley and on his release in 2001, he was signed by Macclesfield going on to make his debut towards the end of his first season. Before leaving he made over a century of appearances. In December 2006, a goal he scored against Stockport was awarded the accolade of coming second in the "Goal of the Year 2006" competition, bettered only by a goal scored by Argentina in the FIFA World Cup. Welch also won Conference National Goal of the season award 2008–09 for an 80-yard lob against Crawley Town.

He left Altrincham in February 2011.

Managerial career
Welch managed in the Cheshire League with Middlewich Town.

In August 2021, Welch became assistant manager at Altrincham's reserve team.

Honours
Conference National (V): 2006

References

1982 births
Living people
Sportspeople from Crewe
English footballers
Republic of Ireland association footballers
Association football defenders
Barnsley F.C. players
Macclesfield Town F.C. players
Accrington Stanley F.C. players
Northwich Victoria F.C. players
Altrincham F.C. players
English Football League players
National League (English football) players